Benjamin Hugg is an Australian singer-songwriter, who had an Australian hit single in 1974 with "Thank God You're Here with Me" which reached No.36 on the Australian Kent Music Report.

In 1974, Hugg won "Best new Talent" at the King of Pop Awards.

Discography

Albums

Singles

Awards and nominations

King of Pop Awards
The King of Pop Awards were voted by the readers of TV Week. The King of Pop award started in 1967 and ran through to 1978.

|-
| 1974
| himself
| Best New Talent  
| 
|-

References

Living people
Australian male singers
Australian musicians
Australian singer-songwriters
Year of birth missing (living people)